The Holy Eucharist Cathedral Also Cathedral of the Holy Eucharist  It is the name that receives a religious building affiliated with the Catholic church that is located in New Westminster, a city in the Lower Mainland region of British Columbia, Canada, and a member municipality of Metro Vancouver.

The cathedral is the mother church of the Ukrainian Catholic Eparchy of New Westminster (Latin: Eparchia Neo-Vestmonasteriensis Ucrainorum) which was created in 1974 by the bull "Cum territorii" of Pope Paul VI.

It is one of the 2 Catholic cathedrals in the Vancouver area, the other being that of the Holy Rosary that follows the Roman or Latin Rite of the Catholic Church. In 2018 the cathedral received 2 pieces of Mother Teresa of Calcutta's hair, so the creation of a reliquary was commissioned to protect them

Its current administrator is the Bishop Kenneth Nowakowski.

See also 
 List of cathedrals in Canada

References

Ukrainian Catholic cathedrals in Canada
Catholic cathedrals in British Columbia
New Westminster